Viktor Andersson (born 6 November 1992) is a Swedish freestyle skier. He competed at the 2018 and 2022 Winter Olympics.

On 31 March 2022, he announced his retirement from skicross.

References

1992 births
Living people
Freestyle skiers at the 2018 Winter Olympics
Freestyle skiers at the 2022 Winter Olympics
Swedish male freestyle skiers
Olympic freestyle skiers of Sweden
21st-century Swedish people